The fourth Mar del Plata chess tournament was held in the city of Mar del Plata, Argentina, in March 1941. The first three Mar del Plata international tournaments (1928, 1934, 1936) were regarded as the third, fourth, and sixth South American Chess Championship (Torneo Sudamericano), respectively. The first Torneio Sulamericano took place in Montevideo (Carrasco), Uruguay, in 1921/22. 

After the 8th Chess Olympiad at Buenos Aires 1939, many participants had decided to stay in Argentina due to outbreak of World War II. The 1941 Mar del Plata tournament therefore included eleven refugees from Europe and two players affected by issues arising out of the British Mandate of Palestine.

The results and standings:

References

Chess competitions
Chess in Argentina
1941 in chess
Sport in Mar del Plata
1941 in Argentine sport
March 1941 sports events
International chess competitions hosted by Argentina